Jacquelyn Brechtel Clarkson (born January 17, 1936) is an American politician who served in the Louisiana House of Representatives from 1994 to 2002, and multiple tenures on the New Orleans City Council (1990–94, 2002–06, 2007–2013). She has been Honorary consul of Lithuania in New Orleans since December 2014. She is the mother of actress Patricia Clarkson.

Background
Clarkson's maternal grandmother, Sophie Bass, was a Jewish immigrant from Lithuania. She is the daughter of Sophie (née Berengher) and Johnny Brechtel, a football coach. She is married to Arthur Clarkson and they have five daughters, including Academy Award-nominated actress Patricia Clarkson. Before entering politics she was in real estate and president of the Louisiana Realtor Association.

She represented District C on the New Orleans City Council from 1990 to 1994 and from 2002 to 2006, as well as District 102 at the Louisiana House of Representatives. The boundaries of District 102 are roughly the same as the Algiers neighborhood (also known as the Fifteenth Ward) in New Orleans.  Those of District C include Algiers, as well as the Vieux Carré or French Quarter neighborhood.

After Hurricane Katrina
Clarkson ran for Councilmember at Large in 2006, but she lost in the general election, often called the runoff in Louisiana, against Arnie Fielkow, another Democrat and former Executive Vice President of the National Football League's New Orleans Saints. Mayor Ray Nagin won re-election only after facing a much tougher challenge than expected before the hurricane, and half of the council members who ran again were defeated.

The resignation of Councilmember at Large Oliver Thomas in 2007 over bribery charges enabled Clarkson to return on New Orleans City Council.  She was elected to her first term as Councilmember-at-Large in a special election in November 2007, defeating Cynthia Willard-Lewis.

Clarkson in 2008 and 2009 became particularly outspoken in defending likeminded councilwoman Stacy Head in a feud with city sanitation director Veronica White. Clarkson called for White's dismissal, but Nagin defended White.

Clarkson was re-elected as Councilmember at Large in February 2010 (again narrowly defeating Cynthia Willard-Lewis), and was named president of the council in May 2011.

Election history
Although a lifelong Democrat, Clarkson has received support from Republican organizations including the Parish Executive Committee of the Orleans Parish Republican Party. In 2008 she broke party ranks and supported Republican challenger Anh "Joseph" Cao in his longshot but successful bid to unseat Democratic incumbent William J. Jefferson from Louisiana's 2nd congressional district seat.  Likeminded fellow Democratic Councilwoman Stacy Head found herself soon facing a recall petition. Clarkson, however, was not subjected to a recall effort; as councilwoman-at-large she represents a broader constituency, and she is more ingrained into the New Orleans political scene. In May 2009, as the New Orleans e-mail controversies intensified, Clarkson began publishing thousands of her e-mail messages online:
Anything we don't want the public to see, we shouldn't put in an e-mail. . . . Just let us do it responsibly so private information about our constituents doesn't get out there.

Footnotes

See also
Anh "Joseph" Cao
Arnie Fielkow
Stacy Head
Cynthia Hedge-Morrell
William J. Jefferson
Shelley Stephenson Midura
Ray Nagin
Rosalind Peychaud
Cynthia Willard-Lewis

External links

 Clarkson campaign website : https://web.archive.org/web/20071022171110/http://jackieclarkson.org/ JackieClarkson.org
Oral History Interview with Jacquelyn Clarkson from Oral Histories of the American South
 City of New Orleans : https://web.archive.org/web/20051108055806/http://www.cityofno.com/
 Louisiana Secretary of State : https://web.archive.org/web/20060911211304/http://www.sos.louisiana.gov/
 New Orleans Times-Picayune : http://www.nola.com/weblogs/bourbon/index.ssf?/mtlogs/nola_bstdiaries/archives/2003_05.html

1936 births
20th-century American politicians
21st-century American politicians
American people of Lithuanian-Jewish descent
American real estate brokers
Jewish American state legislators in Louisiana
Living people
Democratic Party members of the Louisiana House of Representatives
New Orleans City Council members
Women city councillors in Louisiana
Women state legislators in Louisiana
21st-century American women politicians
20th-century American women politicians
21st-century American Jews